Lewis Alfred Mounce (June 20, 1857 – August 23, 1935) was a lumberman and political figure in British Columbia. He represented Comox in the Legislative Assembly of British Columbia from 1900 to 1903.

He was born in Avondale, Hants County, Nova Scotia, the son of William Mounce, and was educated in Avondale and Sackville, New Brunswick. In 1889, Mounce married Euphemia Frame. He served as mayor of Cumberland from 1897 to 1898. In the 1900 election, even though there were no official party affiliations, Mounce campaigned as a supporter of the Conservative Party. He died in Vancouver at the age of 76.

References 

1857 births
1935 deaths
Independent MLAs in British Columbia
Mayors of places in British Columbia
Canadian Methodists
People from Hants County, Nova Scotia